Jim Denomie (1955 – March 1, 2022) was an American Ojibwe painter, known for his colorful, at times comical, looks at United States history and Native Americans.

Background

Early life

A member of the Lac Courte Oreilles Band of Lake Superior Chippewa Indians, Denomie lived on reservation until the age of four when his family moved to Chicago, Illinois due to forced government relocation programs taking place within Native communities in the 1960s. This program, started by Dillon S. Myer, head of Bureau of Indian Affairs, hoped to assimilate American Indians into mainstream America by providing job and housing opportunities in major cities for selected families and individuals.
 
The stress of the relocation is credited as a contributing factor to the divorce of Denomie's parents, and he went to live with his mother, at the age of five, in Minneapolis. In the summers and winters he visited his grandparents on the reservation.

A young adult

As a youth Denomie struggled in school with the pressures to conform and fit in. Seeking support from family members on how to deal with racism, stereotypes and peer-pressure rarely helped, as many of his relatives and friends dealt with their own conflicts in regards to assimilation into American culture. As a teenager he started to abuse alcohol, which he stopped drinking in 1990.

Higher education

That year he began to attend the University of Minnesota, pursuing a degree in health science. Eventually he became involved with the American Indian student organization on campus, meeting other Indian students and engaging in Native art, culture, politics, language and other subjects he was not exposed to in his public school education. Denomie also became a teaching assistant in the American Indian studies department. Switching majors, in 1995 he received his Bachelor of Fine Arts from Minnesota. In his art classes he was exposed to Western art history and movements, and he began to form his own style and techniques.

Personal life

A husband, father, and grandfather, Denomie lived and worked in Shafer, Minnesota. Aside from painting, he also worked in photography, collage and other mixed media explorations. He was also an avid golfer. He was represented by Bockley Gallery.

Denomie died of cancer at his home on March 1, 2022, at the age of 67.

Artistic career

He holds his mirror up to Indigenous people as surely as he does to Americans and American culture. Denomie's art addresses everyone with equal rigor and has important lessons for all viewers. - Gail Tremblay

Creation process

Starting with a theme, he then started an initial sketch which served as a rough draft, refining it until it was ready to be executed into a painting. With paintings ripe with color and heavy texture, he at times mixed his paints directly on the canvas when working quickly. His large scale works always receive a ground layer of paint which assists in forming a general composition. He described his process as a "chess game", derived from the many decisions he must make when placing, layering and constructing his detailed works.

When asked when he decided a painting was completed, Denomie stated:

...a painting is done when the artist dies. Previously, I felt that a painting was done when I have taken it as far as I could, at that point in time, and signed it. Now, if the painting is still in my possession and I am not impressed with it, I may rework it. A painting is like a motion picture, always evolving. We hit pause when it looks good to us and then we sign it. But we may come back to it sometime later and look at it again with a perspective enhanced by experience and development and say, “this painting needs more work.”

His preferred creation time was in the evening, listening to music by the likes of Bob Dylan, Creedence Clearwater Revival, Dire Straits, among others. Denomie credited his primary instructors at the University of Minnesota as major influences on his painting, as well as his family, dreams, memories, and his own life experiences.

Metaphorical surrealism

Denomie described his narrative painting style as "metaphorical surrealism". His paintings frequently examine historical and contemporary events in American and Native American history, as well as aspects of pop-culture, art history and Anglo-Indian relations.

Works such as Attack on Fort Snelling Bar and Grill (2007) are a comical examination of 19th century American events and contemporary culture. Inspired by his wife's participation in the 1862 Commemorative March, which took place in March 2006 to honor Dakota women and children forced to walk 150 miles from the Lower Sioux Agency to Fort Snelling due to the refusal by Indian agent Thomas J. Galbraith to release foodstuffs to the community. Andrew Myrick, a storekeeper from the agency, stated that if the Indians were hungry "let them eat grass or their own dung." Myrick was killed on the second day at the Battle of Lower Sioux Agency and when his body was found he had a mouth stuffed full of grass. Many of these events are shown in the painting: Myrick running away from an Indian on a lawnmower with grass in his mouth, Edward Hopper's Nighthawks inspires the Bar & Grill, a World Wrestling Entertainment flag flies high as a tribute to Minnesota governor Jesse Ventura, Edward S. Curtis photographs an Indian couple in their own version of American Gothic, a nude Indian woman riding an appaloosa, and other numerous events and individuals representing Indian Country yesterday and today.

Edward S. Curtis makes a number of appearances as a voyeur in Denomie's artworks. In Edward Curtis, Paparazzi: Skinny Dip Denomie mocks Édouard Manet's Le déjeuner sur l'herbe. A group of four Indians, one in a lake, while the others reclining in a grassy area, relax after a day of skinny dipping and Edward Curtis is shown in the corner, with his camera, prepared to take pictures.

Peking Duck (2008) parodies the Bering Strait theory by showing an Indian riding in a rickshaw carrying Chinese takeout in his hand. Above the taxi is a Denomie's own version of The Creation of Adam, depicting White Buffalo Calf Woman giving a drum to the Lakota people.

Portraits

In 2005 Denomie decided to create a portrait a day for one year as a way to make painting more of  a priority in his life. His busy life wasn't allowing him to work in the studio as often as he liked, and upon returning to the studio after a week of not working he felt like a foreigner. This has led to a collection of hundreds of portraits, primarily small scale works (5x7 inches, 6x8 inches) of American Indians that Denomie described as "Rugged Indians". The portraits are generally head and shoulder portraits, with the individual faced forward, taking between 15 and 30 minutes to complete. The concept, similar to Chris Ofili's Afro Muses series, allowed for Denomie to get his "head into the oven" of art creation. Succeeding at this project, Denomie was no longer painting a portrait a day.

The Afflicted Warriors is a series of portraits depicting male Indian warriors with long hair, a headband a single feather from their head, while some are not adorned. The Wounded Knee series is reminiscent of Picasso's Blue Period, a series of male and female portraits painted in blues, greens and blacks with a touch of white. The portraits are skeletal, representative of the horrors that took place at Wounded Knee. Occasionally they are just general "Rugged Indians" and Denomie signed, dated and perhaps named the portrait after someone it reminded him of.

Wabooz

Denomie's studio, Wabooz Studio, is named for the Ojibwe word for rabbit. Wabooz is a common image in Denomie's paintings, as an animal that he identified with, the rabbit is also representative of the Ojibwe trickster figure Nanaboujou. As an alter ego for Denomie, he allowed himself to enter the works of art he created. Wabooz has even made an appearance in Denomie's portraits as Magic Rabbit, a series of three paintings depicting an alert rabbit wearing a vest with intense almost google-eyes.

Minnesota
Minnesotan politics, news and Indian Country are often found in Denomie's contemporary history paintings. The intense recount between Al Franken and Norm Coleman is shown in Split Decision, where Paul Wellstone is the referee standing between the two politicians, dressed like boxers. Denomie's signature cast of characters sit in the audience: Wabooz, an Indian riding a horse, a coyote, a moose, and plenty of unenthusiastic people.

The landscape Casino Sunrise is Denomie's own remake of the Seal of Minnesota. Governor Tim Pawlenty is represented by "Pawl Bunyan" (a play on Paul Bunyan) and is shown with his pants around his ankles standing directly behind Babe the Blue Ox. Former governor Jessie Ventura is shown only wearing a thong and a feather boa; he has a cigar in his mouth, a fishing rod set with a grenade in one hand, and a fist of money in the other. No politician of recent Minnesota history escapes the wrath of Denomie's paintbrush; Norm Coleman sits on a toilet and Al Franken counts ballots behind him. Indian Country is represented as well through images of lynched Indians from Fort Snelling, an Indian funeral pyre, a Christian church, a member of the American Indian Movement riding a horse and more. A Minneapolis police car relating to arrests made of three Indian men and without enough room for them all in the car, one was placed in the trunk, is also depicted. Of this painting Denomie said, "The Minnesota State seal needed to be updated. It's been a while...This is all history, all of it is history of Minnesota."

Major exhibitions
"Silver River" 2016 Wiesman Art Museum, Minneapolis, MN
"Jim Denomie, Paintings" 2015 Projek Traum, Atelier Glidden Wozniak, Friedrichschaffen, Germany
"Jim Denomie, Dialogues" 2014 Bockley Gallery, Minneapolis, MN
"It's New, It's Now" 2013 Minneapolis Institute of Art, Minneapolis, MN
"The Crow's Shadow Institute of the Arts Biennial" 2012, Hallie Ford Museum of Art, Willamette Universary, Salem, OR
"Counting Coup" Museum of Contemporary Native Art, Santa Fe, NM
Now and Then, 2010, Winona State University, Winona, MN
Transcending Traditions: Contemporary American Indian Artwork, 2010, Mesa Arts Center, Mesa, AZ
Art Quantum, 2009, Eiteljorg Museum of American Indians and Western Art, Indianapolis, IN
Jim Denomie: Recent History, 2009, Bockley Gallery, Minneapolis, MN
Common Ground: Paintings by Julie Buffalohead and Jim Denomie, 2008, Metro State University, St. Paul, MN
Jim Denomie: Recent Works, 2008, Finlandia University, Hancock, MI
New Skins: New Paintings by Andrea Carlson and Jim Denomie, 2007, Minneapolis Institute of Arts, Minneapolis, MN
Reflections of Lewis & Clark, 2005, University of Montana, Missoula, MT
Painting by Jim Denomie, 2004, Plains Art Museum, Fargo, ND
8th Native American Fine Arts Invitational, 2002, Heard Museum, Phoenix, AZ
Truth, 2002, St. John's University, Collegeville, MN
Transitions, 2000, Duluth Art Institute, Duluth, MD
Metaphor and Intuition, 1999, Iowa State University, Ames, IA

Notable awards
McKnight Distinguished Artist Award, 2019
Eiteljorg Fellowship for Native American Fine Arts, 2009
Bush Artist Fellowship, 2008

References

External links

Jim Denomie, Vision Project, by Bradley Pecore
"Color with an edge: Jim Denomie critiques culture with biting humor" from the Star Tribune
An interview with Denomie from Radio Minnesota Artists

1955 births
2022 deaths
20th-century American painters
American contemporary painters
American male painters
Artists from Minneapolis
Artists from Wisconsin
Deaths from cancer in Minnesota
Native American male artists
Native American painters
Ojibwe people
People from Chisago County, Minnesota
People from Hayward, Wisconsin
University of Minnesota College of Liberal Arts alumni
21st-century American painters
20th-century American male artists
21st-century American male artists